
Year 437 (CDXXXVII) was a common year starting on Friday (link will display the full calendar) of the Julian calendar. At the time, it was known as the Year of the Consulship of Aetius and Sigisvultus (or, less frequently, year 1190 Ab urbe condita). The denomination 437 for this year has been used since the early medieval period, when the Anno Domini calendar era became the prevalent method in Europe for naming years.

Events 
 By place 

 Europe 
 Flavius Aetius, Roman general (magister militum), secures the besieged city of Narbonne (Southern Gaul) against King Theodoric I. He concludes a peace treaty with the Visigoths, and becomes consul for the second time.
 July 2 – Valentinian III, age 18, rules as emperor over the Western Roman Empire. His mother Galla Placidia ends her regency, but continues to exercise political influence until her death in 450.
 October 29 – Valentinian III cements an alliance with the eastern emperor, Theodosius II, by marrying his daughter Licinia Eudoxia in Constantinople. This marks the reunion of the two branches of the House of Theodosius.
 Battle of Wallop: Ambrosius Aurelianus, leader of the Romano-British, defeats the Anglo Saxons under King Vortigern. He is given all the kingdoms of the western side of Britain (according to Historia Brittonum).

 Mesoamerica 
 K'inich Yax K'uk' Mo' dies after an 11-year reign. He is the founder and first ruler of the pre-Columbian Maya civilization centered at Copán (modern Honduras).

 By topic 

 Religion 
 A synod at Constantinople attempts to impinge on the Pope's rights in Illyria. Proclus tries to implement the synod's decisions, and Pope Sixtus III reminds the Illyrian bishops of their obligations to his vicar at Thessaloniki.

Births 
 Childeric I, king of the Salian Franks (approximate date)
 Remigius, bishop of Reims (approximate date)

Deaths 
 Li Jingshou, princess of the Xiongnu state Northern Liang

References